Zsombor Berecz (born 26 April 1986 in Budapest) is a Hungarian sailor. He competed at the 2020 Summer Olympics in Finn class, winning the silver medal, and in the 2008 and 2012 Summer Olympics in the Men's Laser class, where he finished 29th and 21st respectively.

References

External links 
 
 
 
 

Hungarian male sailors (sport)
Living people
Olympic sailors of Hungary
Sailors at the 2008 Summer Olympics – Laser
Sailors at the 2012 Summer Olympics – Laser
1986 births
Sportspeople from Budapest
Sailors at the 2016 Summer Olympics – Finn
Medalists at the 2020 Summer Olympics
Olympic medalists in sailing
Olympic silver medalists for Hungary
Sailors at the 2020 Summer Olympics – Finn